Xième (Tenth), like its name in French indicates, is La Bottine Souriante's 10th released album. A studio album released in 1998, it was released in the United States under the title Rock 'n Reel.

Track listing
"Reel du Forgeron"
"Les trois cavaliers"
"Arin Québec"
"Chanson de Mathurin"
"Medley des Éboulements"
"Ciel d'Automne"
"Yoyo-Verret"
"Suite Métisse"
"Un air si doux"
"Alice au pays d'Arto" (Prelude)
"Alice au pays d'Arto" (Valse)
"Ami de la bouteille"
"Margot Fringue"

1998 albums
La Bottine Souriante albums